Cities which are far away from a sea port use a dry port to promote trade. This is a list of dry ports in Pakistan.

Azad Kashmir
 Muzaffarabad Dry Port

Balochistan
 Chaman Border Terminal
 Quetta Railway Dry Port
 Quetta NLC Dry Port
 Taftan Border Terminal

Gilgit-Baltistan
 Gilgit Dry Port
 Sost Dry Port

Islamabad Capital Territory
 Islamabad Dry Port

Khyber Pakhtunkhwa
 Torkham Border Terminal
 Azakhel Dry Port
 Havelian Dry Port
 Peshawar Dry Port
 Jamrud Dry Port

Punjab
 Faisalabad Dry Port
 Lahore Dry Port
 Lahore NLC Dry Port
 Multan Dry Port
 Rawalpindi Dry Port
 Sialkot Dry Port
 Sialkot International Container Terminal
 Wagha Border Terminal
 Islamabad dry port

Sindh 
 Hyderabad dry port
 Karachi NLC Dry Port

See also
 List of ports in Pakistan

References